The Autumn Effect is the third studio album by the American alternative metal band 10 Years. Produced by Josh Abraham, released on August 16, 2005 through Universal Records and Republic Records. Featured on the album is the popular modern rock track "Wasteland" and two other singles, "Through the Iris" and "Waking Up".

Due to the success of "Wasteland", The Autumn Effect broke 10 Years into the mainstream and as of December 6, 2017, the album has received a Gold certification from the RIAA.

Album information 
The album peaked at number 72 on the Billboard 200, and made a re-entry into the top 100 of the chart, based on the growing mainstream success of the single "Wasteland". The album as a whole has been frequently compared to the work of Tool, Deftones, and, to a lesser extent, Incubus.

Slightly different versions of the songs "Wasteland", "Through The Iris", and "Insects" all appeared on the 2004 album Killing All That Holds You.

The hidden track "Slowly Falling Awake" is after "The Autumn Effect", however not as a separate track.

There are two instrumental pieces in negative time prior to "Wasteland" and "Empires". They will automatically be played if the tracks prior to Wasteland and Empires ("Cast It Out" and "Through the Iris", respectively) are played. If played from an MP3 device or computer, these instrumental pieces will be on the same track as "Cast It Out" and "Through the Iris" and play after the songs are over.

Track listing

Bonus tracks
"The Autumn Effect" (Piano version) (Japan & iTunes bonus track) – 4:22
"Pacemaker" (Best Buy exclusive) – 3:42

Original Release Tracks
"Cast It Out" (With Instrumental) - 5:35
"Through the Iris" (With Instrumental) - 5:41
"The Autumn Effect" (With "Slowly Falling Awake") - 9:32

The Compact Disc release has the songs "Cast It Out" and "Through the Iris" with instrumentals at the end of each song, plus "Slowly Falling Awake" at the end of "The Autumn Effect". The digital download versions of the album (including the iTunes version) do not include these instrumentals or "Slowly Falling Awake".

Personnel

10 Years
Jesse Hasek – vocals
Ryan "Tater" Johnson – lead guitar, backing vocals
Matt Wantland – rhythm guitar
Lewis "Big Lew" Cosby – bass
Brian Vodinh – drums, backing vocals

Guest musicians
Michael Harrison – violin
Ruth Brugger-Johnson – violin
Novi Novog – viola
Nancy Stein-Ross – cello
Rick Bemis – double bass

Artwork
Travis Stevens – art direction, photography
Dean Karr – photography
Carol Farneti – foster humming bird photography

Production
Josh Abraham – producer
Ryan Williams – sound engineer, mixing
Tom Baker – mastering
Ross Garfield – drum technician
Brett Allen – guitar technician

Management
Adrian Vallera – A&R
Anthony Rollo – A&R For Universal Records
Michael Ullman – business management for Platinum Financial Management, Inc.
Christian L. Castle, Esq. – legal representation 
Adrian Vallera, Dean Cramer, Steve Ross – worldwide management 
Michael Arfin  – worldwide booking agent for Artist Group International 
Dave Kirby – european booking agent for The Agency Group

Charts
Album

Singles

Certifications

References

Autumn Effect, The
Autumn Effect, The
Albums produced by Josh Abraham
Universal Records albums
Republic Records albums